Angelo "Angel" Juan Marcos Batista  (Spanish ) is a fictional character in the Showtime television series Dexter and the novels by Jeff Lindsay upon which it is based. He is portrayed in the television series by David Zayas. Batista spends much of the series as a Sergeant before being promoted to Lieutenant in the final season.

Character biography
Angelo "Angel" Juan Marcos Batista is a Detective in Miami Metro Police Department's Homicide Division.  He works closely with Dexter Morgan (Michael C. Hall) during cases, often teaming up with him for his expert advice on serial killers. He also functions as friend and mentor to Detective Debra Morgan (Jennifer Carpenter), Dexter's foster sister.

Angel is a friendly, good natured man who provides a sense of humanity and compassion in Dexter's life. While he is prone to making rash decisions and acting on emotion, he does not harbor any resentment for even the worst fate hands to him and is shown to care deeply for those who work around him. He is also well known for his trademark fedora hat which he is almost never seen without. Due to his position as a divorced, lonely police officer, he considers himself a cliché.

Season one
When Angel arrives on the scene of a foot chase called in by James Doakes (Erik King), he finds the suspect dead. When first questioned by Internal Affairs, Batista lies for Doakes, saying the other man shot first. However, he later tells the truth, saying that he made a promise to his father that he would always be an honest man.  When Batista cheats on his wife, he tells his wife about the indiscretion, which leads to their separation (something he tries to keep hidden from everyone).

One night at a club Batista sees a woman with a prosthetic hand, the nails painted in the same manner as the victims of the Ice Truck Killer, a serial killer who preys on prostitutes. He investigates and finds out that the woman had a customer with an amputee fetish. In an attempt to chase the lead, he talks with prosthetic technician Rudy Cooper (Christian Camargo) about patients he may have that have the same fetish. Cooper — who is none other than the Ice Truck Killer — then stabs Batista. While recovering, Batista agrees to a divorce with his wife. He also helps to uncover Cooper's true identity by asking for Cooper's prints to be compared to mental institution files.

After three months of being on his own, Batista turns to spiritual enlightenment to lessen his pain. He claims to be Dexter's best friend, much to Dexter's confusion, as he has never given Batista any reason to think so. However, Dexter eventually admits that Batista is the closest thing he has ever had to a real friend.

Season two
In season two, Batista and the rest of the department try their best to alleviate the grief from families of the Bay Harbor Butcher victims. He becomes especially involved in one case of a suspected murderer named Oscar Sota. When he talks to Sota's widow (Bertila Damas) in his office, he ends up having a heated and frustrating argument with her about what her husband was actually doing to be targeted by the Butcher. Feeling guilty, he goes to her house and offers her a sincere apology. She begins to trust Batista, and offers him more details on the case.

He eventually takes an interest in Dexter's on-off lover Lila Tournay (Jaime Murray), and asks her out after she and Dexter break up.  Unbeknownst to Batista, however, Lila is only using him to get close to Dexter. To that end, she takes Rohypnol after having rough sex with Batista, and then accuses him of date rape. Batista is terrified of being convicted, as it will ruin his career and his life. After Dexter kills Lila, the charges are dropped, much to Batista's relief. During an awkward but heartfelt conversation, Dexter tells Batista that if he were "normal", he would want to be a man like him.

Season three
In season three, Batista is promoted to Sergeant and made the department's new lead case investigator to replace the now-deceased Doakes. However, it appears as his life as a divorced father is beginning to take its toll; he risks his career to get a hooker who turns out to be an undercover cop. After persistent but gentlemanly advances, Batista begins a relationship with the officer, Barbara Gianna (Kristin Dattilo). He so fears losing her that he begins acting irrationally, leaving her a long-winded message begging forgiveness for having to cancel dinner because of work. However, Barbara finds this funny, brings him a take-out dinner, and their relationship appears strong. After she is assaulted, Batista gets in a violent altercation with the man who hurt her, but Dexter intervenes and calms him down.  He attends Dexter's wedding with Barbara as his date.

Season four
By the start of season four, it appears that Batista and Barbara have amicably split, and he is now romantically involved with his Lieutenant, Maria LaGuerta (Lauren Vélez). Neither wishes for their relationship to become public, in fear of losing their jobs and "defining something indefinable". He looks to Dexter for advice, and he then becomes an involuntary counselor between the two. Toward the end of the season, they secretly get married with Dexter as witness.

Season five
Batista and LaGuerta's marriage are constantly challenged by their work disagreements. At first, Batista constantly caves in to LaGuerta's demands, but grows more and more frustrated and jealous. When a drunk police officer makes sexual remarks about LaGuerta ("she gave the best blowjobs in Miami"), Batista, also drunk, beats him up and ends up being investigated by Internal Affairs. LaGuerta teams up with the investigating officer, but that prompts Batista to be even more jealous; he starts checking her cell phone for suspicious messages and finds a rendezvous appointment in a hotel room. Outraged, he walks in on them, only to find out that it was intended to be a sting operation to apprehend a corrupt narcotics cop, in which LaGuerta agreed to participate to bail Batista out of the investigation. When LaGuerta's bad judgment call leads to an informant's death, she pins the blame on Debra, rekindling their rivalry. Upset by LaGuerta's decision, Batista decides to stick to Debra's story and does so in his written statement; he also helps Debra when she insists on reopening the Barrel Girls case after LaGuerta closed it too soon—although he fails to convince LaGuerta himself. Ever since, Batista's approach towards LaGuerta's bossiness has drastically changed, as he has been "cutting her off" every time she seems to try to overpower his decision. However, in the season finale they seem to have set their relationship back on track.

Season six
Batista has moved in with his younger sister Jamie (Aimee Garcia) in the apartment adjacent to Dexter's, thus allowing Jamie to babysit Dexter's son Harrison whenever Dexter might need to leave in the middle of the night. It turns out that he and LaGuerta separated in order for her to secure the position of Captain in Miami Metro Homicide. However, her position as Lieutenant was left open specifically for him by her recommendation. To her surprise, Deputy Chief Tom Matthews (Geoff Pierson) decided to promote Debra to Lieutenant instead. Debra breaks this news to Batista, who takes it in stride and congratulates her, but is still hurt by constantly being involved in LaGuerta's battles with Matthews. Detective Joey Quinn (Desmond Harrington) also begins criticizing Batista for not telling LaGuerta how he feels, which almost results in a fight at a crime scene. Their relationship is further strained when Quinn drunkenly makes crude remarks about Jamie; angered, Batista punches him out.

When Jamie starts dating forensics intern Louis Greene (Josh Cooke), Batista makes a failed attempt to scare him away during a dinner with both of them.

In the season finale, the season's main villain, serial killer Travis Marshall (Colin Hanks), knocks him unconscious.

Season seven
In season seven, Batista considers retiring after his friend and colleague Detective Mike Anderson (Billy Brown) is murdered. Batista wants to buy a restaurant by the beach, saying that thinking about the restaurant is the only thing that makes him happy. He initially has trouble finding the money and dealing with the paperwork, but his problems are solved when Quinn gives him a great deal of money for a down payment; he does not tell Batista that the money was laundered by the Russian Mafia. In the season finale, Batista has his retirement party at the restaurant on New Year's Eve.

Season eight
In season eight, Batista chooses to continue running the restaurant while also returning to Miami Metro. He is promoted to Lieutenant of Homicide after Debra leaves Miami Metro. He holds a dedication ceremony for LaGuerta, who was killed in the season 7 finale, and gives a reluctant Dexter a vase she kept in her old office.

Quinn is now dating Jamie, and Batista pressures him to take the sergeant's exam to prove that he is serious about the relationship and his future. Quinn does well on the exam, but Batista ultimately chooses another candidate after being pressured by Matthews.

In "Monkey in a Box", Batista reinstates Debra as a detective, unaware that she killed LaGuerta. In the series finale, "Remember the Monsters?", however, Debra is shot by serial killer Oliver Saxon (Darri Ingolfsson) and falls into a persistent vegetative state. When Quinn attacks Saxon in the interrogation room, Batista does nothing to stop him, and threatens Saxon with the electric chair unless he confesses. Dexter later kills Saxon in full view of a security camera, but Batista accepts his claim of self-defense and lets him go. It is suggested that both Batista and Quinn know the truth, but turn a blind eye because they wanted to kill Saxon themselves. Batista is last seen receiving the news about Dexter's apparent death; unbeknownst to him, Dexter staged his death and is living under another identity.

Dexter: New Blood
In "Runaway", it is revealed that between the end of the original series and New Blood that Batista has been promoted to the Captain of Homicide of the Miami Metro Police Department. He attends a conference in New York City attended by Iron Lake Police Department Chief Angela Bishop (Julia Jones). Batista tells Angela about Dexter Morgan and his son, Harrison – unaware that Angela's boyfriend, "Jim Lindsay", is in fact Dexter living under another identity, and that she has met Harrison. Batista's story makes Angela suspicious, and ultimately leads to her discovering her boyfriend's true identity. 

In the series finale, "Sins of the Father", Batista is contacted by Bishop, who suspects Dexter of being the Bay Harbor Butcher, and sends him a picture of her and Morgan together dated a month prior. Batista realizes that Dexter is alive and heads to Iron Lake with LaGuerta's old files on the Butcher case. However, his arrival in the town is never shown, as the show ends before he gets there.

Differences from the novels
In the book series, Angel Batista habitually introduces himself as "no relation" (to Cuban former dictator Fulgencio Batista), and as a result is nicknamed "Angel-no-relation" by Dexter.  He also plays a less prominent role in the novels than in the television series, and is a forensic scientist rather than a homicide detective.

References

External links

Dexter (series) characters
Fictional police sergeants
Television characters introduced in 2004
Characters in American novels of the 21st century
Fictional businesspeople
Fictional Miami-Dade Police Department detectives
Fictional police lieutenants
American male characters in television
Male characters in television
Fictional police captains